Crossing of the Rhine or Rhine crossing may refer to:

Military
 Crossing of the Rhine, east to west, into the Roman Empire by Vandals, Alans and Suebi, 406 AD
 Rhine Campaign of 1796#Crossing the Rhine, a French army crossed from west to east
 Operation Plunder,  Allied forces, west to east, 1945
The associated battle honour "Rhine Crossing" issued to British units participating

Art
 Crossing of the Rhine by the army of Louis XIV, 1672, painting by Joseph Parrocel
 The Passage of the Rhine, on the Porte Saint-Denis monument in Paris, sculpture by Michel Anguier
 Passage of the Rhine in 1795,  painting by Louis-François, Baron Lejeune

See also 

 Rhine
 History of crossings of the Rhine